= Marcus Tisdale =

Marcus Tisdale is a comedian from the San Francisco Bay Area. In 2014, he released the viral YouTube video "Can You Smoke Crack In Front of SF Cops and Not Get Caught?" which garnered tens of thousands of Youtube views.
